Douglas Håge (6 March 1898 – 18 November 1959) was a Swedish actor. He appeared in nearly 100 films between 1932 and 1959.

Selected filmography

 Career (1938)
 Just a Bugler (1938)
 The Great Love (1938)
 Nothing But the Truth (1939)
 With Open Arms (1940)
 Only a Woman (1941)
 Goransson's Boy (1941)
 Skipper Jansson (1944)
 Dolly Takes a Chance (1944)
 My People Are Not Yours (1944)
 Blood and Fire (1945)
 The Girls in Smaland (1945)
 Oss tjuvar emellan eller En burk ananas (1945)
 It Rains on Our Love (1946)
 While the Door Was Locked (1946)
 Evening at the Djurgarden (1946)
 A Ship to India (1947)
 Poor Little Sven (1947)
 Private Karlsson on Leave (1947)
 Dinner for Two (1947)
 The Bride Came Through the Ceiling (1947)
 Song of Stockholm (1947)
 The Night Watchman's Wife (1947)
 Music in Darkness (1948)
 Private Bom (1948)
 A Swedish Tiger (1948)
 Life at Forsbyholm Manor (1948)
 Playing Truant (1949)
 Fiancée for Hire (1950)
 Teacher's First Born (1950)
 Knockout at the Breakfast Club (1950)
 My Friend Oscar (1951)
 A Ghost on Holiday (1951)
 The Chieftain of Göinge (1953)
 Café Lunchrasten (1954)
 Men in the Dark (1955)
 Whoops! (1955)
 The Summer Wind Blows (1955)
 The People of Hemsö (1955)
 A Little Nest (1956)
 Miss April (1958)
 Fridolf Stands Up! (1958)
 Sängkammartjuven (1959)

References

External links

1898 births
1959 deaths
Swedish male film actors
People from Gothenburg